Auber's ameiva (Pholidoscelis auberi), also known commonly as the Cuban ameiva, is a species of lizard in the family Teiidae. The species is native to the Bahamas and Cuba. There are 40 recognized subspecies.

Etymology
The specific name, auberi, is in honor of Cuban botanist Pedro Alejandro Auber (1786–1843).

Habitat
The preferred natural habitats of P. auberi are shrubland and forest.

Diet
P. auberi preys upon invertebrates.

Reproduction
P. auberi is oviparous.

Subspecies
Including the nominotypical subspecies, 40 subspecies of P. auberi are recognized as being valid. 25 of these subspecies are found on Cuba and its associated islets.

References

Further reading
Cocteau [J-T], Bibron [G] (1838). "Reptiles ". pp. 1–143. In: de la Sagra R (1838). Historia Fisica, Politica y Natural de la Isla de Cuba. Segunda Parte. Historia Natural. Tomo IV. Reptiles y Peces. Paris: Arthus Bertrand. 255 pp. (Ameiva auberi Cocteau, new species, pp. 51–55). (in Latin and Spanish).
Goicoechea N, Frost DR, De la Riva I, Pellegrino KCM, Sites J Jr, Rodrigues MT, Padial JM (2016). "Molecular systematics of Teioid lizards (Teioidea/Gymnophthalmoidea: Squamata) based on the analysis of 48 loci under tree-alignment and similarity-alignment". Cladistics 32 (6): 624–671. (Pholidoscelis auberi, new combination).
Schwartz A, Thomas R (1975). A Check-list of West Indian Amphibians and Reptiles. Carnegie Museum of Natural History Special Publication No. 1. Pittsburgh, Pennsylvania: Carnegie Museum of Natural History. 216 pp. (Ameiva auberi, pp. 50–54).

Pholidoscelis
Lizards of the Caribbean
Reptiles described in 1838
Taxa named by Jean Theodore Cocteau